Bole or Bole - Bamboi is one of the constituencies represented in the Parliament of Ghana. It elects one Member of Parliament (MP) by the first past the post system of election. Bole is located in the Bole district  of the Savannah Region of Ghana.

Boundaries
The seat is located within the Bole district of the Savannah Region of Ghana.

Members of Parliament

Elections

See also
List of Ghana Parliament constituencies

References 

Parliamentary constituencies in the Savannah Region